Tolsta Chaolais (also Tolastadh Chaolais, Tolstadh a' Chaolais) is a village on the Isle of Lewis, Scotland. The name has a Norse element, Tolsta, combined with a Gaelic element, Caolas, and means "Farm by the Strait". Tolsta Chaolais is in the parish of Uig, and has a building as a place of worship for all denominations.

In 1979 the village was photographed by Fay Godwin as part of a landscape photography project funded by the Arts Council of Great Britain. One of Godwin's photographs of Tolsta Chaolais was published in her 1985 book of rural landscapes, Land.

In 2013, the village was the location of much of the filming for the CBeebies children's television programme Katie Morag.

References

External links 

 Village website
Canmore - Lewis, Tolsta Chaolais, War Memorial site record
Canmore - Lewis, Tolsta Chaolais, Horizontal Mill site record

Villages in the Isle of Lewis